The 1918 Limerick Senior Hurling Championship was the 26th staging of the Limerick Senior Hurling Championship since its establishment by the Limerick County Board in 1887.

Newcastle West were the defending champions.

Claughaun won the championship after being granted a walkover by Newcastle West in the final. It was their fourth championship title overall and their first championship title in two years.

Results

Final

References

Limerick Senior Hurling Championship
Limerick Senior Hurling Championship